CTBC Financial Holding Co., Ltd. (Former: ChinaTrust Financial Holding Company Ltd.) is a holding company  principally engaged in the finance industry through its eight major subsidiaries. Assets — $115.7 billion (2015). The holding company is based in CTBC Financial Park, Taipei, Taiwan.

CTBC Bank (former: Chinatrust Commercial Bank) at its core,
CTBC Securities Co.
CTBC Insurance Brokers Co.
CTBC Venture Capital Co.
CTBC Asset Management Co.
CTBC Bills Finance Corp.
CTBC Security Co.
Taiwan Lottery Corporation

The company's products and services are classified into eight categories: banking, including corporate banking, consumer finance and retail banking; securities, including securities brokerage, trading and underwriting services, as well as the securities-related futures business; bill and bond, including brokerage, trading, underwriting, certification, guarantee and advisory services; insurance brokerage, providing property and life insurance services; venture capital, focusing on the high technology industries, such as telecommunications semiconductor industries; asset management, including the acquisition, management and processing of financial debts from financial institutions; security services, such as stationing of security guards in office buildings, and lottery, including issuance, marketing, promotion, prize drawing, prize claiming, and management.

See also
 List of companies of Taiwan

References

External links
CTBC Financial Holding website

Banks of Taiwan
Financial services companies of Taiwan
Holding companies of Taiwan
Companies based in Taipei
Banks established in 2002
Holding companies established in 2002
Taiwanese companies established in 2002